The Immigration Bridge was a proposed footbridge in Canberra, the capital of Australia. It was proposed that it be built between the National Museum of Australia and Lennox Gardens on the south shore of the West Basin of Lake Burley Griffin, in the centre of the city. 

The non-profit organisation Immigration Bridge Australia (IBA) was promoting the bridge as a means of recognising the contributions immigrants have made to Australia and was seeking AUD22 million in donations from the public and between AUD10 million and AUD15 million from the Commonwealth Government for its construction. Initial concept plans for the bridge showed it as having a walkway twelve metres above the lake's surface supported by twelve pylons. IBA have claimed the original design was a "concept only" and a small number, or possibly zero, pylon bridge is a possibility. The proposal had proven controversial, and a Commonwealth Parliamentary inquiry into the bridge held during early 2009 received 20 submissions, most of which opposed the concept. The inquiry's final report recommended that the bridge be redesigned to take the needs of other lake users such as cyclists and sailors into account and that its site be moved if it is not possible to reach a compromise.

Many argue that the inclusion of a bridge within West Basin is inconsistent with Walter Burley Griffin's vision for the lake, however the inclusion of a bridge to Acton Peninsula is clearly visible in the winning design, although in a slightly different location to the concept design. 

The Immigration Bridge was abandoned on 30 March 2010 due to heritage and safety concerns. The project has already raised hundreds-of-thousands of dollars from the public. The proponents of the bridge are working on plans for a national immigration monument that will be located near the National Archives of Australia in the parliamentary triangle in Canberra, using the money already raised.

References 

Proposed bridges in Australia
Buildings and structures in Canberra
Transport buildings and structures in the Australian Capital Territory